Tímea Babos and Sloane Stephens were the defending champions; however, they didn't participate this year.

Irina Khromacheva and Demi Schuurs won the tournament, defeating Gabrielle Andrews and Taylor Townsend in the final, 6–4, 5–7, [10–5].

Seeds

Draw

Finals

Top half 
{{16TeamBracket-Compact-Tennis3
| RD1=First round
| RD2=Second round
| RD3=Quarterfinals
| RD4=Semifinals

| RD1-seed01=1
| RD1-team01= Indy de Vroome Yulia Putintseva
| RD1-score01-1= 
| RD1-score01-2= 
| RD1-score01-3= 
| RD1-seed02=WC
| RD1-team02= Samantha Crawford Catherine Harrison
| RD1-score02-1=w/o
| RD1-score02-2= 
| RD1-score02-3= 

| RD1-seed03= 
| RD1-team03= Marie Elise Casares Valeria Patiuk
| RD1-score03-1=77
| RD1-score03-2=1
| RD1-score03-3=[10]
| RD1-seed04= 
| RD1-team04= Makoto Ninomiya Risa Ozaki
| RD1-score04-1=65
| RD1-score04-2=6
| RD1-score04-3=[5]

| RD1-seed05= 
| RD1-team05= Stephanie Nauta Blair Shankle
| RD1-score05-1=6
| RD1-score05-2=5
| RD1-score05-3=[10]
| RD1-seed06= 
| RD1-team06= Elena-Teodora Cadar Nao Hibino
| RD1-score06-1=3
| RD1-score06-2=7
| RD1-score06-3=[3]

| RD1-seed07= 
| RD1-team07= Barbara Haas Petra Rohanová
| RD1-score07-1=3
| RD1-score07-2=0
| RD1-score07-3= 
| RD1-seed08=8
| RD1-team08=
| RD1-score08-1=6
| RD1-score08-2=6
| RD1-score08-3= 

| RD1-seed09=4
| RD1-team09= Victoria Duval Anett Kontaveit
| RD1-score09-1=3
| RD1-score09-2=6
| RD1-score09-3=[7]
| RD1-seed10=WC
| RD1-team10= Gabrielle Andrews Taylor Townsend
| RD1-score10-1=6
| RD1-score10-2=3
| RD1-score10-3=[10]

| RD1-seed11= 
| RD1-team11= María Inés Deheza María Paula Deheza
| RD1-score11-1=6
| RD1-score11-2=6
| RD1-score11-3= 
| RD1-seed12= 
| RD1-team12= Başak Eraydın Emily Fanning
| RD1-score12-1=3
| RD1-score12-2=2
| RD1-score12-3= 

| RD1-seed13= 
| RD1-team13= Daria Gavrilova Ganna Poznikhirenko
| RD1-score13-1=6
| RD1-score13-2=65
| RD1-score13-3=[8]
| RD1-seed14= 
| RD1-team14= Jang Su-jeong Lee So-ra
| RD1-score14-1=3
| RD1-score14-2=77
| RD1-score14-3=[10]

| RD1-seed15= 
| RD1-team15= Ellen Allgurin Anna Danilina
| RD1-score15-1=6
| RD1-score15-2=1
| RD1-score15-3=[8]
| RD1-seed16=5
| RD1-team16= Madison Keys Grace Min
| RD1-score16-1=4
| RD1-score16-2=6
| RD1-score16-3=[10]

| RD2-seed01=WC
| RD2-team01= S Crawford C Harrison
| RD2-score01-1=6
| RD2-score01-2=6
| RD2-score01-3= 
| RD2-seed02= 
| RD2-team02= ME Casares V Patiuk
| RD2-score02-1=3
| RD2-score02-2=4
| RD2-score02-3= 

| RD2-seed03= 
| RD2-team03= S Nauta B Shankle
| RD2-score03-1=2
| RD2-score03-2=78
| RD2-score03-3=[6]
| RD2-seed04=8
| RD2-team04=
| RD2-score04-1=6
| RD2-score04-2=66
| RD2-score04-3=[10]

| RD2-seed05=WC
| RD2-team05= G Andrews T Townsend
| RD2-score05-1=6
| RD2-score05-2=6
| RD2-score05-3= 
| RD2-seed06= 
| RD2-team06= MI Deheza MP Deheza
| RD2-score06-1=2
| RD2-score06-2=4
| RD2-score06-3= 

| RD2-seed07= 
| RD2-team07= S-j Jang S-r Lee
| RD2-score07-1=6
| RD2-score07-2=4
| RD2-score07-3=[2]
| RD2-seed08=5
| RD2-team08= M Keys G Min
| RD2-score08-1=2
| RD2-score08-2=6
| RD2-score08-3=[10]

| RD3-seed01=WC
| RD3-team01= S Crawford C Harrison
| RD3-score01-1=3
| RD3-score01-2=4
| RD3-score01-3= 
| RD3-seed02=8
| RD3-team02=

Bottom half

External links 
 Main draw

2011 US Open (tennis)
US Open, 2011 Girls' Doubles